The 1970 Tasman Touring Series was an Australian motor racing competition for Series Production Touring Cars. It was the inaugural Tasman Touring Series.

The series was won by Allan Moffat driving a Ford Falcon GTHO.

Schedule
The series comprised three rounds, each held in support of an Australian round of the 1970 Tasman Championship.

Classes
Cars competed in five price classes:

 Class A: Up to $1860
 Class B: $1861 to $2250
 Class C: $2251 to $3100
 Class D: $3101 to $4500
 Class E: Over $4500

Points system
Points were awarded on a 9-6-4-3-2-1 basis for the first six positions in each class.
Bonus points were awarded on a 3-2-1 basis for the first three outright positions.

Series standings

Note: Only the first three placegetters are listed in the table.

Manufacturers Trophy
The Manufacturers Trophy was awarded to the Ford Motor Company of Australia.

References

Tasman Touring Car Series